Alexandra "Sascha" Bogojevic (born 1951) is a German television and film actress. Bogojevic has continued her career in television films and television series since the 1980s. In 1998, she ended her actor career.

Selected filmography
 The Morals of Ruth Halbfass (1972)
 The East Frisian Report (1973)
 Revenge of the East Frisians (1974)
 Salon Kitty (1976)

References

Bibliography

External links

1951 births
Living people
Actresses from Munich
German film actresses
German television actresses
German female models
German people of Yugoslav descent